Oak Ridge Railroad Overpass is a historic Pratt truss bridge located near Shipman, Nelson County, Virginia. It was built by the Keystone Bridge Company in 1882, and is a single-span, through Pratt truss with two wooden beam approach spans. It carries VA State Route 653 over the busy Norfolk Southern Washington District, part of the former Southern Main Line between Washington, D.C. and Atlanta.

It was listed on the National Register of Historic Places in 1978.

See also
List of bridges documented by the Historic American Engineering Record in Virginia
List of bridges on the National Register of Historic Places in Virginia

References

External links

Historic American Engineering Record in Virginia
Railroad bridges in Virginia
Railroad bridges on the National Register of Historic Places in Virginia
Bridges completed in 1882
Buildings and structures in Nelson County, Virginia
National Register of Historic Places in Nelson County, Virginia
Pratt truss bridges in the United States
Metal bridges in the United States